Sir Alan Whiteside Munro  (23 May 1898 – 8 July 1968) was a member of the Queensland Legislative Assembly. He was the Deputy Premier of Queensland from 1963 until 1965.

Early life
Munro was born in Brisbane, Queensland, the son of George Whiteside and his wife Florence Emily Maude (née Schmidt). He attended Brisbane Grammar School and after finishing school he was a public servant for the federal government from 1913 until 1924 and then he took up accounting for the rest of his career.

He was a member of the Volunteer Defence Corps from 1941 to 1944 and chairman of the Queensland State Council of the Institute of Chartered Accountants 1940–1942. Munro then became president of the Brisbane Chamber of Commerce from 1942–1944 and Chairman of Directors of Queensland Newspapers Pty Ltd, from 1949–1950.

Political career
Munro, representing the Liberal Party, won the seat of Toowong at the 1950 Queensland state election, replacing the retiring member, Charles Wanstall. He held the seat until 1966 when he retired from politics to allow "younger men to take the reins".

He served in several roles in the government of the day, including:
 Attorney-General – 1957
 Minister for Justice and Attorney-General – 1957–1963 
 Leader of the Liberal Party and Deputy Premier – 1962–1965 
 Minister for Industrial Development – 1963–1965

He was awarded a Knight Commander of the Order of the British Empire on 12 Jun 1965 for his "distinguished and statesmanlike services to the state as a minister and parliamentarian".

Personal life
On 29 June 1921 Munro married Minnie Beryl Nicholson  (died 1977) and together had two sons. One son, Sergeant Donald Whiteside Munro, died in New Guinea while flying his Kittyhawk in 1942. Munro died in Brisbane in July 1968 and was accorded a state funeral.

References

1898 births
1968 deaths
Members of the Queensland Legislative Assembly
Deputy Premiers of Queensland
Attorneys-General of Queensland
Australian Knights Commander of the Order of the British Empire
Liberal Party of Australia members of the Parliament of Queensland
20th-century Australian politicians